Marcel Aboulker (1 January 1905 in Algiers – 7 September 1952 in Garches) was a French Algerian screenwriter and film director. Aboulker built up a successful career from the late 1940s directing comedy films before his death from illness at the age of 47.

Selected filmography
 Radio Surprises (1940)
 Les Aventures des Pieds-Nickelés (1948)
 Le trésor des Pieds-Nickelés (1950)
 The Girl from Maxim's (1950)
 Women Are Angels (1952)

Bibliography
 Oscherwitz, Dayna & Higgins, MaryEllen. The A to Z of French Cinema. Scarecrow Press, 2009.

External links

1905 births
1952 deaths
French male screenwriters
20th-century French screenwriters
French film directors
People from Algiers
20th-century French male writers
Migrants from French Algeria to France